Sooriya Nagaram (Tamil:சூரிய நகரம்; English: Sun City) is a 2012 Indian Tamil film written and directed by M. Sellamuthu and produced by X. B. Rajan. The film stars Rahul Ravindran, Meera Nandan, R. V. Udayakumar, and Ganja Karuppu. This was the debut movie of music director Ron Ethan Yohann (credited as Fen Viallee). The film released on 30 March 2012; however, it received negative reviews upon release and did not fare well both critically and commercially.

Plot
A caste-obsessed society causes the death of a young women and her lover at the hands of her own brother.

Cast
Rahul Ravindran as Vetrivel
Meera Nandan as Thamizhselvi
R. V. Udayakumar as Kathirvel 
Udhay as young Senthil
Vivek Rajgopal as adult Senthil
Ganja Karuppu
Soori as Mechanic
Manobala
Anjathe Sridhar as Maari
S. N. Lakshmi
Kovai Guna

Production
For the film, the team had erected a set resembling that of a mechanic garage near Madurai. The first shot was shot here and Bharathiraja has given the first clap for the scene.

Soundtrack
The soundtrack was composed by debutante Fen Viallee and all the lyrics written by Vairamuthu. Think Music India holds the audio rights of the film.
"Manmadha Kadhal" — Karthik, Sujatha
"Kalyanamaam" — Karthik
"Kichu Kichu" — Chinmayi
"Unnai Pirivena" – Karthik, Chinmayi
"Selladhe Jeevane" – SPB, K. S. Chithra

Reception
Behindwoods wrote "There is nothing in the film that makes it something unique to Madurai. Overall, you can say that Sooriyanagaram is a haphazard attempt at making a commercial movie." Indiaglitz wrote "On the whole, there is not much to write home about as far as 'Sooriya Nagaram' is concerned." The Hindu wrote "The story and the screenplay are to be largely blamed for the film's failure to strike a chord with the audience. The whole plot is stretched to such an extent that by the time the film ends, one feels drained and exhausted."

References

2012 films
2010s Tamil-language films
Indian romance films
Films shot in Madurai
2012 romance films
2012 directorial debut films